Anthony Edward Kappes MBE (born 1 March 1973) is an English road and track racing cyclist and Paralympian.

Biography
Born in Stockport, Cheshire, Kappes is partially sighted and competes in the B&VI 1–3 class.

He is the current World record holder for 200 metres, along with his pilot Barney Storey. Storey and Kappes became the first Paralympic team to hold the able-bodied British National Tandem Sprint Championships title in 2006.

Kappes, began working with a new tandem pilot internationally in 2008, Jon Norfolk sacrificed his career as a member of Great Britain's able-bodied squad in order to work with Paralympians, and had to take a three-year break from competition in order to qualify. Kappes and Norfolk beat Simon Jackson and Storey to win the sprint and kilo (Achieving Worlds Best - 1.02.06) events at the 2008 VISA Paralympic World Cup.

Riding with Storey once more at the 2008 Summer Paralympics, Kappes won gold at the Kilo and the Sprint.

Kappes was appointed Member of the Order of the British Empire (MBE) in the 2009 New Year Honours for services to disabled sport.

Palmarès 

2006
 Sprint, World Disability Championships
 Kilo, World Disability Championships

2007
 Sprint, World Disability Championships
 Kilo, World Disability Championships

2008
 Kilo (B&VI 1–3), Paralympics, Beijing (with Barney Storey)
 Sprint (B&VI 1–3), Paralympics, Beijing (with Barney Storey)
1st Sprint, VISA Paralympic World Cup (with Jon Norfolk)

2012
 Cycling at the 2012 Summer Paralympics - Men's sprint (B), Paralympics, London (with Craig MacLean)

See also
 2012 Summer Olympics and Paralympics gold post boxes

References

External links 
British Cycling Bio

1973 births
Living people
English male cyclists
Paralympic cyclists of Great Britain
Cyclists at the 2008 Summer Paralympics
Paralympic gold medalists for Great Britain
Sportspeople from Stockport
Members of the Order of the British Empire
Alumni of the Royal National College for the Blind
Cyclists at the 2012 Summer Paralympics
UCI Para-cycling World Champions
Medalists at the 2008 Summer Paralympics
Medalists at the 2012 Summer Paralympics
Paralympic medalists in cycling